Choreutis torridula is a moth in the family Choreutidae. It was described by Edward Meyrick in 1926. It is found in Sierra Leone.

References

Choreutis
Moths described in 1926